Vantas may refer to:

 Karkat and Kankri Vantas, characters from the webcomic Homestuck
 Vertically aligned carbon nanotube arrays (VANTAs)
 Histrelin acetate, a drug sold under the brand name Vantas
 Vantas, a cancelled brand of Exeed TX SUVs in North America